Pseudo-Basil is the designation used by scholars for any anonymous author of a text falsely or erroneously attributed to Basil of Caesarea. Pseudo-Basilian works are usually known by Latin titles. They are often misattributed only in translation. They include:

Ad Caesarienses apologia de secessu, a letter actually by Evagrius Ponticus
Ad Chilonem discipulum suum
Admonitio ad filium spiritualem, a Latin text and a partial Old English translation
Admonitio ad iuniores
Canones, an Arabic text and some Coptic fragments
Constitutiones asceticae
Contra Eunomium 4–5 (books 1–3 are authentic)
De consotatione in aduersis
De reliquis Dionysii, the sequel to an authentic letter to Ambrose of Milan
De spiritu
De virginitate ad Letoium, an Old Church Slavonic translation from Greek, actually by Basil of Ancyra
De vita in Christo, a Coptic translation from Greek, also misattributed to Athanasius
Dialogus IV de sancta Trinitate, an Armenian translation from Greek and Syriac fragments, also misattributed to Athanasius
Doctrina, quoted in the Georgian Ethika of Euthymius the Athonite
Epitimia
Epitimia diversorum sanctorum de refectorio
Erotapokriseis Basilii et Gregorii, an Arabic translation from Greek of an erotapokriseis sometimes also misattributed to John Chrysostom
Liturgia sancti Basilii alexandrina, a Greek liturgy of the Alexandrian rite, also known in Arabic, both Bohairic and Sahidic Coptic and Ethiopic versions
Transitus de dormitione Deiparae, a Georgian translation from Greek

Numerous apocryphal Basilian letters exist: to Bishop Eusebius of Samosata; to Eustathius, archiatrus and son of Oribasius; to Bishop Innocent of Tortona; to the Emperor Julian the Apostate; to Libanius; "to a lapsed monk" (ad monachum lapsum); to the Emperor Theodosius I; to the monk Urbicius on continence; and "to a widow" (ad viduam).

References

Bibliography

Pseudonymous writers